Wunnatheikdi Indoor Stadium() is an indoor stadium located inside Zabuthiri Sports Complex in Naypyidaw. It is composed of Stadium (A), Stadium (B) and Stadium (C). Stadium (A) and (C) have a capacity of 3,000 and Stadium (B) has a capacity of 5,000.

It was built to use in 2013 Southeast Asian Games.Construction began in 2011 and opened in 2013.Currently, national level sports festivals are being held in this stadium.It also hosted the 19th AUG in 2018 and used as the main stadium.

Gallery

References

Multi-purpose stadiums in Myanmar